British Tanker Company Limited was the maritime transport arm of the Anglo-Persian Oil Company, the forerunner of BP. Formed in 1915 with an initial fleet of seven oil tankers, the British Tanker Company became the BP Tanker Company in 1955.

History

Early days
From the moment oil was discovered in Persia (now Iran) in May 1908, the issue arose of how best to ship it back to Britain. The Anglo-Persian Oil Company (APOC) initially employed independent contractors; principally the Asiatic Petroleum Company, a subsidiary of Royal Dutch Shell, to carry the oil by sea. In 1912 the company acquired its first ocean going ship, the SS Ferrara, a conventional freighter that carried oil products in metal cases. Tankers were unable to berth in Abadan owing to a natural sand bar off the coast known as the Shatt-al-Arab Bar, and often had to anchor up to 40 miles from the port.  This meant oil had to be lightered out to the ships.  Accordingly, APOC made two further shipping purchases, a barge Friesland and a tug Sirdar-i-Naphte.  This situation remained until the mid 1920s when the bar was eventually dredged to allow ships direct access to the port.

1915 to 1945 

However, the directors of APOC soon decided it would be better for the company to possess its own fleet of tankers. It set up the British Tanker Company Limited (BTC) in April 1915, with an initial capital of £100,000. The BTC placed orders with two Tyne based shipbuilders, Armstrong Whitworth and Swan Hunter, for a total of seven steam-powered oil tankers.  The names of the first ships bore the prefix British, and most future additions to the fleet followed the same naming convention.  This acknowledged the fact that the British government had invested heavily in the fledgling company to ensure a supply of fuel oil for the Royal Navy.

BTC's first tanker was the 3,663 grt British Emperor, launched in 1916. She was employed to take oil from Abadan to the ports of Bombay, Karachi, Madras and Calcutta.

BTC's share capital was doubled to £200,000 in 1916, and further increased to £3,000,000 in November 1917.

In 1917 APOC made a successful offer to the British government for the assets of the former German-owned Benzin und Petroleum BP AG seized on the outbreak of war. This included the associate Petroleum Steamship Company (PSSC) whose 13 oil tankers passed into BTC ownership.  The same year BTC was chosen by the Royal Navy to manage seven RFA tankers, giving it management experience that proved valuable post-war.  The PSSC, now a subsidiary of BTC, took over ownership of the locally manned and managed fleet of small craft operating at Abadan.

By 1919 the fleet had grown to 25 ships, a motley collection of new and second hand vessels including the Scandinavia, the only sailing ship ever operated by BTC.

Over the next decade, the demand for oil grew throughout the industrialised world, and BTC expanded its fleet accordingly. By 1924 the fleet numbered 60 vessels. The 60th ship was the new flagship, the 6,998 grt British Aviator. She was the BTC's first diesel engined oil tanker, and was at that time the most powerful single-screw motor ship in the world. A significant event was the signing of a contract with P&O in 1923 to supply bunkering facilities for the latter's ships.

The cargoes carried by BTC ships consisted of both crude oil and refined oil products; the main refined products being fuel oil, benzine and kerosine. During the 1920s the principal destination for BTC was the United Kingdom, which accounted for around half of all cargoes discharged. Twice as much crude oil was delivered to the United Kingdom as refined products, with most of the crude oil being taken to the newly established refineries at Llandarcy and Grangemouth.  The next largest destination for BTC was India, receiving 14% of the total cargoes carried. Cargoes discharged in Europe increased steadily, and by 1928 accounted for 13% of the total. In 1928 BTC's fleet consisted of 80 seagoing tankers, five coastal vessels and four government owned steamers, with a further 13 seagoing tankers being chartered by the BTC.

The Depression
With the onset of the Great Depression in the early 1930s, the merchant navies around the world faced increasing unemployment. However, through a number of strategic mergers, as well as the continuing support of the Shah of Iran, APOC managed to strengthen its position within the industry, and the BTC's fleet continued to grow until the launch of British Energy in 1931 marked the end of the post-war fleet renewal. In 1932, APOC reached an agreement with Royal Dutch Shell to combine their UK domestic marketing and distribution networks.  This involved the transfer of some ships to a jointly owned company, Shell-Mex and BP.  With careful management BTC only laid up six ships for an average of six weeks between 1930 and 1935.  In 1935, with the Depression receding, the company started placing orders with British shipyards for a further 24 ships. The same year, at the Shah's request, the company was renamed the Anglo-Iranian Oil Company.

Second World War
With the outbreak of the Second World War in 1939, the British government chartered BTC's whole fleet of 93 vessels to transport fuel for its armed forces. In addition the company was made responsible for the management of requisitioned ships and American assistance tonnage.  By 1942 the company had 146 ships under its control.  The fleet lost 44 of its own ships and six managed ships sunk during the war, many during the Battle of the Atlantic and the Mediterranean U-Boat campaign, with two others so badly damaged they could only be used as storage hulks. In addition two ex-BTC tankers operated by Italian companies were sunk by British submarines while a third was sunk by RAF Coastal Command.

1945 to 1955
Within two years of peace in 1945, BTC had restored its fleet to its pre-war total of 93 ships. This included the purchase of 10 American wartime T2 tankers and three ex merchant aircraft carriers. The recovery was further bolstered by the building of 57 new tankers, each of 8,600 grt. These new ships increased the tonnage of oil transported from the Abadan refinery, but they remained within the limits imposed by the requirement to sail through the shallow waters of the Suez Canal.  At this time the company decided that the old principle of owning 90% of its required tonnage was too onerous and that chartered vessels should be employed to make up the average 50% annual shortfall. To ease the problems of managing this large fleet an associated shipping company, the Lowland Tanker Company, was formed in association with Mathesons and Common Brothers of Newcastle to operate 10 time-chartered tankers exclusively for BTC.

In 1951 the situation changed dramatically, when Iran nationalised its oil industry. AIOC removed all its staff from the country, and for a while had no access to Iranian oil. AIOC set about forming new alliances with other oil producing countries, especially Kuwait and Bahrain.  The crisis lead to a major emergency logistics operation being undertaken to reroute and repurpose the tanker fleet to cope with the loss of the refining capacity at Abadan. In addition the Petroleum Steamship Company's fleet of barges, tugs, lighters and ancillary craft was hastily evacuated to Basra and Kuwait.

In the early 1950s BTC began increasing the size of its deep-sea ships by building 13 so-called 'supertankers', each of 18,000 grt. These larger ships were particularly useful during the Suez crisis of 1956, which closed the Suez Canal and forced ships to sail around the Cape of South Africa, adding  to their journey.

In November 1954 AIOC renamed itself the British Petroleum Company, and the BTC became the BP Tanker Company from 1 Jun 1956, British Soldier being the first ship turned out in the new company's colours.

The ships

Fleet list 1915 to 1945

Fleet list 1945 to 1956

Subsidiary companies
A number of second-hand ships weren't integrated into the main fleet but were operated by subsidiary companies, often a single ship per company.  These vessels were not renamed into the British sequence. The principal subsidiary companies were The Petroleum Steam Ship Company, The Lowland Tanker Company and the jointly owned Shell-Mex and BP company.

House flag 

The first house flag consisted of the black letters BTC set in a white circle on a white horizontal band, the white bordered with black, all set against a red background.

In 1926/7 the flag was changed to include the Persian colours. This new house flag consisted of the red Cross of Saint George on a white background, with a large green lozenge imposed over the centre of the cross, the lozenge containing a golden lion 'passant guardant'; the lion being a symbol of Persia.
This remained until 1954, when a red lion 'rampant' replaced the golden lion.

References

Sources
 National Archives, Kew
 BP Magazine Issue 2, 2009: page 24
 Lloyd's shipping registers

External links
 Plimsoll Ship Data website – Lloyd's shipping registers 1930 to 1945
 Allied ships hit by U-Boats during the Second World War
 National Archives, Kew – Second World War Merchant shipping movement cards
 The position of ship wrecks – vessels of the British Tanker Company
GTZX – Fleet details
 

Anglo-Persian Oil Company
Former BP subsidiaries
Defunct shipping companies of the United Kingdom
Ships of BP Shipping
Tanker shipping companies
World War II merchant ships of the United Kingdom